"When the Motherland Calls Upon Us" is a Chinese patriotic song and march used extensively by the People's Liberation Army. It was written by Hu Hongwei, the Deputy Commander of Shenyang Song District Marching Song and Dance Ensemble, to music by Placido Domingo. The song praises the bravery and initiative of the People's Liberation Army, and pays particular homage to Dong Cunrui and Huang Jiguang, two celebrated Chinese war heroes.

Lyrics

See also
Dong Fang Hong I
The East Is Red (1965 film)
Honglaowai
Maoism
"Ode to the Motherland"
"Sailing the Seas Depends on the Helmsman"
"Without the Communist Party, There Would Be No New China"

External links
A video of the song being played

Chinese patriotic songs
Asian anthems
Chinese military marches